Brendon Leitch (born 28 November 1995), is a New Zealand motor racing driver.

Career
Leitch began car racing in the Formula Ford category in 2009, racing in the South Island Formula Ford Championship. The following year, he would contend the New Zealand Formula Ford Championship, with modest results. The following two years would be more successful for Leitch, finishing third in the 2011-12 championship, and second the following season.

Following these strong performances, Leitch would contend the Toyota Racing Series for the 2014 season - joining brother Damon. Leitch's most successful season to date would be the 2016 season, where he scored one win, three podiums and third overall in the driver standings. Following this, Leitch secured a drive in the Formula 4 United States Championship for 2017. After a strong campaign, Leitch returned to New Zealand and would contend his fifth consecutive season in the Toyota Racing Series.

In December 2018, it was announced that Leitch would contend his sixth season in the Toyota Racing Series with Victory Motor Racing.

Racing record

Career summary

† As Leitch was a guest driver, he was ineligible to score points.

Complete F3 Asian Championship results 
(key) (Races in bold indicate pole position) (Races in italics indicate fastest lap)

Complete Formula Regional Oceania Championship Results
(key) (Races in bold indicate pole position) (Races in italics indicate fastest lap)

References

External links
 

Sportspeople from Invercargill
New Zealand racing drivers
Living people
1995 births
Formula Ford drivers
Toyota Racing Series drivers
F3 Asian Championship drivers
24H Series drivers

International GT Open drivers
Asian Le Mans Series drivers
United States F4 Championship drivers
BlackArts Racing drivers
Lamborghini Super Trofeo drivers